Halcrow Stadium was a greyhound racing stadium in Annan Road, Gretna, Scotland

History
The plans to build a new greyhound stadium on a ten-acre site, west of Gretna were first instigated in 1983. The name Halcrow derives from Jim Halcrow a well-known Shetland accordionist. The construction was started by James Norman and sons as a replacement for the previous track at Raydale Park and the first race meeting took place in June 1986.  Distances included 120, 300, 490 and 685 metres over a circumference of 380 metres, more recently distances of 280 and 470 metres were used.

The racing remained independent and was not controlled by the Greyhound Board of Great Britain. Amenities included several bars, a hospitality suite and function rooms for parties, weddings and traditional music events. 

The track was closed in April 2017.

References

Greyhound racing in Scotland
Sports venues completed in 1986
Sports venues in Dumfries and Galloway
Gretna, Dumfries and Galloway